is a district located in Fukushima Prefecture, Japan.

As of 2003, the district has an estimated population of 31,847 and a density of 83.50 persons per km2. The total area is 381.38 km2.

Towns and villages
Kagamiishi
Ten'ei

Merger
 On April 1, 2005 the town of Naganuma and the village of Iwase merged into the city of Sukagawa.

Districts in Fukushima Prefecture
District Iwase